Under New Management, also known as Honeymoon Hotel, is a 1946 British comedy film directed by John E. Blakeley and starring Nat Jackley, Norman Evans and Dan Young. The screenplay concerns a chimney sweep inherits a hotel and calls on a number of ex-army friends to staff it. The film was one of a number of films at the time dealing with the contemporary issue of demobilisation following the end of the Second World War.

Plot
Chimney sweep Joe (Norman Evans) inherits a dilapidated hotel which, with the help of former army chums as staff, he starts to turn around. A pair of devious property developers however, attempt to buy the hotel from him, knowing that the land is due to be redeveloped, and to increase in value when an airport is built nearby.

Cast

 Nat Jackley - Nat
 Norman Evans - Joe Evans
 Dan Young - Dan
 Betty Jumel - Betty
 Nicolette Roeg - Brenda Evans
 Cavan O'Connor - the Strolling Vagabond
 Michael Taylor - Reg Allen
 Tony Dalton - Tony
 Marianne Lincoln - Marianne
 Bunty Meadows - Bunty
 Lynda Ross - Speciality Act
 John Rorke - Father Flannery
 Aubrey Mallalieu - John Marshall
 G. H. Mulcaster - William Barclay
 Babs Valerie - Bride
 Hay Petrie - Bridegroom
 Lily Lapidus - an Hotel Guest
 Gordon McLeod - Mr. Allen
 Joss Ambler - Hotel Manager
 David Keir - Colonel
 John Allen - Norman Wade	
 Dick Beamish - Hotel Servant	
 Arthur Wollum - Hotel Servant	
 Donovan Octette - Speciality Act	
 Mendel's Female Sextette - Speciality Act	
 Percival Mackey Orchestra - Themselves

References

Bibliography
 Mundy, John. The British musical film. Manchester University Press, 2007.

External links

1946 films
1946 comedy films
British comedy films
Films directed by John E. Blakeley
Films set in hotels
British black-and-white films
Films shot in Greater Manchester
1940s English-language films
1940s British films